Gros-Réderching (Lorraine Franconian: Grossrederschinge) is a commune in the Moselle department of the Grand Est administrative region in north-eastern France.

The village belongs to the Pays de Bitche. The similarly named commune Petit-Réderching lies 6 km to the east. Localities of the commune: Brandelfing, Olferding, Welschhoff and Singling which is a former neighbour commune and a part of Gros-Réderching since 1811.

See also
 Communes of the Moselle department

References

External links
 

Grosrederching